William Brent Steytler (born 29 April 1947) is a former South African cricketer who played for Northern Transvaal in South African domestic cricket. He was a left-arm orthodox bowler. His father is South African and his mother is Brazilian.

Steytler was born in São Paulo, Brazil, but was raised in Pretoria, South Africa, attending Pretoria Boys High School. He made his first-class debut for North Eastern Transvaal in December 1968, in a Currie Cup game against Western Province. He played another three Currie Cup matches the following season, but none at all over the two subsequent seasons. Returning to the Northern Transvaal line-up for the 1972–73 season, Steytler took a maiden first-class five-wicket haul, 5/79 against Griqualand West. He also made his first limited-overs appearances, although with little success. After the 1974–75 season, where Steytler made only two appearances for Northern Transvaal, he did not reappear until the 1977–78 season. Against Transvaal B in what was to be his final first-class appearance, he took a career-best 5/71, including the wicket of future South African international Ray Jennings. Steytler's final match for Northern Transvaal was a limited-overs game against Transvaal in October 1978.

Notes

References

External links
Player profile and statistics at CricketArchive
Player profile and statistics at ESPNcricinfo

1947 births
Living people
Brazilian cricketers
Brazilian people of South African descent
Brazilian emigrants to South Africa
Northerns cricketers
South African cricketers
Sportspeople from São Paulo